Lisa Diane Rohde (born August 12, 1955) is an American former competitive rower and Olympic silver medalist.  She was a member of the American women's quadruple sculls team that won the silver medal at the 1984 Summer Olympics in Los Angeles, California.  Rohde graduated from the University of Pennsylvania in 1979.

References

 

1955 births
Living people
American female rowers
Rowers at the 1984 Summer Olympics
Olympic silver medalists for the United States in rowing
Medalists at the 1984 Summer Olympics
People from Wakefield, Nebraska
21st-century American women